Dina Nagar Assembly constituency (Sl. No.: 5) is a Punjab Legislative Assembly constituency covering Dina Nagar in Gurdaspur district, Punjab state, India.

Members of Legislative Assembly

Election results

2022

2017

2012

2007

References

External links
 

Assembly constituencies of Punjab, India
Gurdaspur district